Bernabé Zapata Miralles was the defending champion but chose not to defend his title.

Francisco Cerúndolo won the title after defeating Tomás Martín Etcheverry 6–1, 6–2 in the final.

Seeds

Draw

Finals

Top half

Bottom half

References

External links
Main draw
Qualifying draw

Internazionali di Tennis del Friuli Venezia Giulia - 1
2021 Singles